Maundia  is a genus of alismatid monocots, described in 1858. Maundia was formerly included in the family Juncaginaceae but is now considered to form a family of its own under the name Maundiaceae. It contains only one known species, Maundia triglochinoides, endemic to Australia (States of Queensland and New South Wales).

The species is listed as vulnerable.

References

Bibliography 

 
 , in 
 

Monotypic Alismatales genera
Endemic flora of Australia
Taxa named by Ferdinand von Mueller